Charles Emery Tooke Jr. (July 19, 1912 – September 1986) was an attorney from Shreveport, Caddo Parish, Louisiana, who served as a Democrat in the Louisiana State Senate from 1948 to 1956, alongside, first, Riemer Calhoun and, then, B. H. "Johnny" Rogers, both of DeSoto Parish. 
 
Tooke was born in DeRidder in Beauregard Parish in southwestern Louisiana, to Charles Emery Tooke Sr. (1880-1951), a native of Bienville Parish in northwestern Louisiana, and the former Bessie Lee Roberts (1887-1961). He had a brother, Jack Roberts Tooke (1918-1972), and a sister, Sarah Katherine Tooke Pankey (1914-2012), who was an educator, primarily in Winnsboro in Franklin Parish, Louisiana. 
 
Tooke was a lieutenant commander in the United States Navy Reserve during World War II. He worked in the military government and civil affairs of the Navy in the Pacific Theater of Operations. Tooke and his first wife, Lucia, had six children. Following the death of his first wife, Tooke married Thais Grimes.
 
Tooke is interred at Forest Park Cemetery in Shreveport, alongside his first wife, Lucia.

References

 

 

1912 births
1986 deaths
People from DeRidder, Louisiana
Politicians from Shreveport, Louisiana
Democratic Party Louisiana state senators
Louisiana lawyers
United States Navy officers
United States Navy personnel of World War II
20th-century American lawyers
20th-century American politicians